Sithu Thanbawa (or more commonly, as ;  – 1390s?) was a Burmese prince who held in fief the Five Irrigated Districts (centered around present-day Yamethin District) of the Ava Kingdom in the late 14th century. Descended from the Pagan royal lines from both sides, the prince was an ancestor of kings Mingyi Nyo, Tabinshwehti and Nanda of the Toungoo dynasty.

Brief
Probably born in the late 1360s, Sithu Thanbawa was the elder child of Prince Sithu Min Oo of Pinya and Princess Minkhaung Medaw of Ava. His father was a son of King Uzana I of Pinya (r. 1325–1340) and his mother was a daughter of King Swa Saw Ke of Ava (r. 1367–1400). He had one younger brother Thray Sithu, who later became governor of Myinsaing.

According to the royal chronicles, Sithu Thanbawa held the Five Irrigated Districts (ရေလွှဲ ငါးခရိုင်; present-day Yamethin District and surrounding regions), by 1390. However, unlike most other feudal lords of the day, who were also governors of their fiefs, the prince apparently did not assume administrative duties of his fiefs, since he is not listed as a governor of the Yamethin District, not in 1390 or any time before or after, in the chronicles. (In 1390, his granduncle Gov. Thilawa was governor of the region.) Furthermore, unlike other princes of the day, he went to the front only once, in 1390–1391 when he commanded a regiment during the Forty Years' War.

In all, the prince is not heard from again in the chronicles after 1390–1391, except with regard to his descendants. He had at least one child, Gov. Sithu of Paukmyaing. Through that child, kings Mingyi Nyo, Tabinshwehti and Nanda of the Toungoo Dynasty, were Sithu Thanbawa's descendants.

Ancestry
Prince Sithu Thanbawa was descended from the Ava–Pinya–Myinsaing royal lines, and ultimately the Pagan royalty from both sides.

Notes

References

Bibliography
 
 
 
 
 

Ava dynasty
1360s births